The Atlanta Radio Theatre Company. (ARTC) is a 501(c)(3) non-profit organization dedicated to preserving, promoting, performing, and educating people about the art of audio theatre (radio drama).

Activities
ARTC performs live audio drama at a wide variety of events, often with a very specific focus on science fiction, Horror or Fantasy.  They have been performing roughly 24 years, and have performed at such notable venues as DragonCon, Mythic Journeys, Stone Mountain, and the World Fantasy Convention.

Some of their more noteworthy adaptations include several works by H. P. Lovecraft including The Call of Cthulhu, The Dunwich Horror, and At the Mountains of Madness.  They have also performed adaptations of works by H. G. Wells including The Invisible Man, The Island of Dr. Moreau, and The Time Machine.  However, several authors who do not have work in the public domain have also given permission either personally or through their estate, including Robert A. Heinlein for adaptations of All You Zombies, The Man Who Traveled in Elephants and The Menace From Earth; Margaret Weis and Tracy Hickman for an adaptation of Lord Durndrun's Party;  Henry Lee Forest's Special Order and James P. Hogan's Zap Thy Neighbor.

Over the years, various members of ARTC have participated in or taught classes for various workshops, including the MidWest Radio Theatre Workshop and its successor organization National Audio Theatre Festival, The Himan Brown Workshop at the University of Georgia, and in Macon and Cartersville, Georgia. Their writers continue to teach radio drama writing at science fiction conventions around the country.

History
A brief overview of the history of the Atlanta Radio Theatre Company.

Founding (1984-1992)
ARTC was founded in 1984 by radio personality William L. Brown and actor/director Patrick Stansbury.  They procured underwriting from a local bank to sponsor a weekly, one-hour program on WGST-AM.  The first shows were produced in Brown's home studio.  Atlanta playwright Thomas E. Fuller was enlisted as principal writer, and numerous actors from the local theatrical community were cast in the productions.  Soon Henry Howard, owner of Audio Craft, made his facility available to ARTC and came on board as a producer. ARTC produced a full 13-week schedule for WGST in summer of 1984.  That fall ARTC moved to WABE-FM, the local Public Radio station, and ran a full season of thirteen shows.  Then the next year they produced the SouthernAire Workshop for Peach State Public Radio (now Georgia Public Broadcasting.  Most of the shows were performed "live" or "live-on-tape" in-studio.

In the summer of 1987 ARTC began performing live at science fiction conventions.  Their first live performance was at the first DragonCon. The play was H. P. Lovecraft's "The Call of Cthulhu" as adapted by Gerald W. Page.

Also in 1987 ARTC introduced the Centauri Express Audio Magazine—the first audio magazine. It ran for five issues and contained plays, reviews of other audio products, and news of interest to the SF audience. Centauri Express was funded with a grant from the 1986 World Science Fiction Convention, ConFederation, held in Atlanta.

Explosion (1992-2002)
Under Fuller's leadership, ARTC established a troupe of professional and semi-professional actors, writers, directors, and technicians, to create live and in-studio productions of audio drama.

In 1993 and 1994, they began performing monthly at a coffee house in the Little Five Points district in Atlanta. This theater experience allowed for the development of new writers, gave the actors more radio experience, and allowed for experimentation with new formats and styles.  These coffee house shows created many new stand-alone plays as well as radio series in the style of the programs from the golden age of radio.

After the coffee house closed, the live performance troupe continued to find venues for live audio theatre.  They performed at a few live music venues, the Decatur Arts Festival, Callanwolde, and several  libraries and bookstores.  They also expanded the number of science fiction conventions at which they performed.

Even during this period ARTC continued to create in-studio audio drama on cassette tape and eventually CDs.  Their 1996 production of H.G. Wells' The Island of Doctor Moreau won a silver Mark Time award for excellence in science fiction audio drama.  It was the first of several awards from the Mark-Time award committee to the Atlanta Radio Theatre Company.

In 1995, ARTC's first web page was posted.

For several years during this period ARTC performed live every Halloween night on Peach State Public Radio - performing and broadcasting from one of the Georgia Public Television studios.

Starting in 1996 with permission from Mrs. Virginia Heinlein to adapt her husband's The Menace from Earth into an audio play, the company has continued to negotiate with contemporary writers for permission to create adaptations of their work.  Among the writers whose work has been adapted by ARTC are:
Robert A. Heinlein,
James P. Hogan,
Brad Linaweaver,
Gerald W. Page,
John Ringo,
Brad Strickland, and
Margaret Weis and Tracy Hickman.

Post-Fuller (2002-present)
In November 2002 Fuller died from a heart attack.  The Atlanta Radio Theatre Company had lost its leader, its head writer, and its voice.  ARTC attracted new writers, new actors, and new leaders.  It continued to expand the number of places where it performed and new productions.

ARTC continued to perform at many science fiction conventions.  Additionally it began searching for a permanent stage home for regular performances.  From 2002 through 2003 it mounted several productions at Stone Mountain Park.  Then in 2006 it began a full theatrical season at Stage Door Players in Dunwoody, Georgia. In 2009 it moved its theatrical home to the Academy Theatre in Avondale Estates, Georgia.

In August 2006, ARTC began to podcast programming gathered from previous live performances.  The podcasts include new material, old fan favorites, and rare performances.

Studio Recordings

The Dean's List
Stories by Robert A. Heinlein.  Adapted with permission of Mrs. Virginia Heinlein.
 The Man Who Traveled in Elephants
 by Robert A. Heinlein
 adapted by Brad Linaweaver
 The Menace From Earth
 by Robert A. Heinlein
 adapted by William Alan Ritch
 Solution Unsatisfactory
 by Robert A. Heinlein
 adapted by Daniel S. Taylor

SF by Gaslight
Classic 19th century literature brought to life.
 The Brides of Dracula
 by Thomas E. Fuller
 inspired by Dracula by Bram Stoker
 Hour of the Wolf
 by Thomas E. Fuller
 The Island of Doctor Moreau
 by H. G. Wells
 adapted by Thomas E. Fuller
 The Passion of Frankenstein
 by Thomas E. Fuller
 inspired by Frankenstein by Mary Shelley
 The Strange Case of Doctor Jekyll and Mister Hyde
 by Robert Louis Stevenson
 adapted by Daniel S. Taylor
 The Time Machine
 by H. G. Wells
 adapted by Thomas E. Fuller?

Into the Labyrinth
Original horror and dark fantasy
 All Hallows' Moon
 by Thomas E. Fuller
 Ghost Dance & Armada Rising
 by Thomas E. Fuller
 The Last Dragon to Avondale & Chronos Beach
 by Thomas E. Fuller
 Special Order
 by Henry Lee Forest
 adapted by Daniel S. Taylor
 A Case of Abuse
 by Ron N. Butler

H. P. Lovecraft
Stories by H. P. Lovecraft.
 At the Mountains of Madness
 by H. P. Lovecraft
 adapted by Brad Strickland
 The Call of C'thulhu
 by H. P. Lovecraft
 adapted by Ron N. Butler
 The Color Out of Space
 by H. P. Lovecraft
 adapted by Ron N. Butler
 The Dunwich Horror
 by H. P. Lovecraft
 adapted by Thomas E. Fuller
 The Rats in the Walls
 by H. P. Lovecraft
 adapted by Brad Strickland
 The Shadow Over Innsmouth
 by H. P. Lovecraft
 adapted by Gregory Nicoll

H. Beam Piper
 He Walked Around the Horses
 by H. Beam Piper
 adapted by Ron N. Butler
 Omnilingual
 by H. Beam Piper
 adapted by Ron N. Butler
 Time and Time Again
 by H. Beam Piper
 adapted by Ron N. Butler

Centauri Express
The first audio magazine.
 Adventures on the Backroads of Time
 Terry Sanders and Clair Whitworth Kiernan
 The Happy Man
 by Gerald W. Page
 The Competitor
 by Brad Linaweaver
 adapted by William Alan Ritch

An ARTC Christmas
Christmas stories and other seasonal celebrations.
 An Atlanta Christmas
 by Thomas E. Fuller
 adapted by Daniel S. Taylor

Aurora
Romance.
 The Hoyden
 by Berta Platas
 Kissed by a Stranger
 by Fiona Karanina Leonard

Live performances

Conventions 
 221B Con 2015
 AnachroCon 2011, 2013
 Antares 1995
 AtomiCon 1993
 Birmingham Radio Theater Workshop 2001
 Burroughs Dum-Dum 1994
 ConFederation 1986
 Costume-Con 2004
 DeepSouthCon 1994, 1996
 DragonCon 1987-2015
 Friends of Old-Time Radio 1997
 Gaylaxicon 2007 (in Atlanta)
 Libertarian Party of Georgia Convention 2001
 Heinlein Centential 2007
 LibertyCon 2005-2011
 NecronomiCon 1994-1998
 OASIS 1998-1999
 PhoenixCon 1993
 Mythic Journeys 2006
 Sci-Fi Summer 2001-2006
 Southeast Antique Radio Show 1998
 TimeGate 2006, 2008
 Under Construction 1994-1995
 World Fantasy Convention 1992
 World Horror Convention 1995, 1999

Theatres
 Cartersville Radio Theater 1994
 Dad's Garage Theatre Company 2002
 Little Five Points Coffeehouse 1993-1994
 Stage Door Players 2006-2007
 Academy Theatre [2008–present]

Other Venues
 Atlanta Science Fiction Society 2002
 Callanwolde 1993
 Camp Willoway 2006
 Eddie's Attic 1997
 Gwinnett History Museum 1999
 Props Restaurant 1994
 Stone Mountain Park 2002–2005, 2007

Bookstores and Libraries
 Atlanta Public Library 1995, 1996, 1997
 Barnes & Noble Bookstore 1995-2007
 Tut's Book Emporium 2006-2007

Schools
 DeKalb School of the Arts 2004
 Parkview High School 2000-2001
 Georgia Tech DramaTech 2000
 University of Georgia, Athens 1994

Special events
 Decatur Arts Festival 1996-2000
 Echo Lounge 2000
 Fellowship of Reason 2003
 Festival of Trees 2001
 Somber Reptile 2000

People

Writers
A list of writers whose work has been adapted for audio by ARTC.
 Robert A. Heinlein
 L. Ron Hubbard
 James P. Hogan
 Rudyard Kipling
 Katherine Kurtz
 Brad Linaweaver
 H. P. Lovecraft
 Greg Nicoll
 Gerald W. Page
 H. Beam Piper
 Terry Pratchett
 John Ringo
 Mary Shelley
 Robert Louis Stevenson
 Bram Stoker
 Brad Strickland
 A. E. van Vogt
 Margaret Weis and Tracy Hickman
 H. G. Wells

Celebrities
Celebrities who have acted on stage or in the studio with ARTC.
 Matt Anderson
 DragonCon 2004 - "Rory Rammer, Space Marshal: Slaves of the Zombie-Tron" by Ron N. Butler
 Robert Asprin
 LibertyCon 2005
 Michael Brady
 DragonCon (many, many years)
 Sci-Fi Summer
 Peter David
 DragonCon 2001 - "Solution Unsatisfactory" by Robert A. Heinlein
 John Rhys-Davies
 DragonCon 2001 - "Guards, Guards" by Terry Pratchett
 Harlan Ellison
 DragonCon 1990 - "The Rats in the Walls" by H. P. Lovecraft
 DragonCon 1998 - "The Man Who Traveled in Elephants" by Robert A. Heinlein
 ... and in the studio production.
 DragonCon 2004 - "The Shadow Over Innsmouth" by H. P. Lovecraft
 Lisa Getto
 Sci-Fi Summer, several years
 Jonathan Harris
 DragonCon 1998 - "Rory Rammer, Space Marshal: The Cosmic Cycloplex" by Ron N. Butler
 Richard Hatch
 DragonCon 2005 - "The Weapons Shop" by A. E. van Vogt
 James Charles Leary
 DragonCon 2004 -
 Tamara Morton
 DragonCon 2004 - "The Menace from Earth" by Robert A. Heinlein
 Ted Raimi
 DragonCon 2000 - "Rory Rammer, Space Marshal: Queen of the Spaceways" by Ron N. Butler
 Michael Sinelnikoff
 DragonCon 2000 - "Most Pierced Man" by Ron N. Butler
 Jewel Staite
 DragonCon 2004 - "The Menace from Earth" by Robert A. Heinlein
 Claire Stansfield
 DragonCon 2000 - "Rory Rammer, Space Marshal: Queen of the Spaceways" by Ron N. Butler
 Brinke Stevens
 NecronomiCon 1996 - "The Menace from Earth" by Robert A. Heinlein
 DragonCon 1998 - "The Man Who Traveled in Elephants" by Robert A. Heinlein
 The studio production of "A Real Babe" by Brad Linaweaver
 Robert Trebor
 DragonCon 1999 - "Rory Rammer, Space Marshal: The Phantom Menace" by Ron N. Butler
 Alexandra Tydings
 DragonCon 2000 - "Rory Rammer, Space Marshal: Queen of the Spaceways" by Ron N. Butler

Awards
2020 Norman Corwin Award given to The Atlanta Radio Theatre Company by the National Audio Theater Festivals for excellence in audio drama.

Awards are given by the American Society For Science Fiction Audio for the best science fiction, fantasy, and horror audio dramas of the year.  There are two awards: the Mark Time Awards for the best science fiction and the Ogle Awards for the best fantasy/horror.
 2004 Mark-Time  Special Award - Best Adaptation
 "The Menace From Earth" by Robert A. Heinlein,
 adapted by William Alan Ritch
 1998 Ogle Silver Award
 "All Hallows Moon" by Thomas E. Fuller.
 1997 Mark-Time Special Award, Best Horror-Fantasy Production
 "The Brides of Dracula" by Thomas E. Fuller.
 1996 Mark-Time Silver Award
 "The Island of Dr. Moreau" by H. G. Wells
 adapted by Thomas E. Fuller.

External links
 WPBA article
 "The Play's the Thing..." by Gary A. Witte
 "Sound it out" by Gary A. Witte
 "There is still Adventure in Sound" by John C. Snider

References

Theatre companies in Georgia (U.S. state)
American radio dramas
Performing groups established in 1984